The Latvian War of Independence, sometimes called Latvia's freedom battles or the Latvian War of Liberation, was a series of military conflicts in Latvia between 5 December 1918, after the newly proclaimed Republic of Latvia was invaded by Soviet Russia, and the signing of the Latvian-Soviet Riga Peace Treaty on 11 August 1920.

The war can be divided into a few stages: Soviet offensive, German-Latvian liberation of Kurzeme and Riga, Estonian-Latvian liberation of Vidzeme, Bermontian offensive, Latvian-Polish liberation of Latgale.

The war involved Latvia (its provisional government supported by Estonia, Poland and the Western Allies—particularly the navy of United Kingdom) against the Russian SFSR and the Bolsheviks' short-lived Latvian Socialist Soviet Republic. Germany and the Baltic nobility added another level of intrigue, initially being nominally allied to the Nationalist/Allied force but attempting to jockey for German domination of Latvia. Eventually, tensions flared up after a German coup against the Latvian government, leading to open war.

Following a cease-fire, a ploy was developed by the Germans, nominally dissolving into the West Russian Volunteer Army led by Gen. Pavel Bermont-Avalov. This West Russian Volunteer Army included Germans and former Russian prisoners of war nominally allied with the White Army in the Russian Civil War, but both Bermondt-Avalov and von der Goltz were more interested in eliminating the nationalists than fighting the Bolsheviks.

Certain episodes of the Latvian Independence War were also part of the Polish-Soviet War, particularly the Battle of Daugavpils.

Soviet offensive
On 18 November 1918 the People's Council of Latvia proclaimed the Independence of the Republic of Latvia and created the Latvian Provisional Government headed by Kārlis Ulmanis.

On 1 December 1918, the newly proclaimed republic was invaded by Soviet Russia. Much of the invading army in Latvia consisted of Red Latvian Riflemen, which made the invasion easier. The Soviet offensive met little resistance.

In the north Alūksne was taken on 7 December, Valka on 18 December, and Cēsis on 23 December, in the south Daugavpils was taken on 9 December, and finally Pļaviņas on 17 December.

Riga was captured by the Red Army on 3 January 1919. By the end of January, the Latvian Provisional Government and remaining German units had retreated all the way to Liepāja, but then the Red offensive stalled along the Venta river.

The Latvian Socialist Soviet Republic was officially proclaimed on 13 January with the political, economic, and military backing of Soviet Russia and on 17 January, a constitution was made for the newly made puppet state.

During this period, on 15 January, occurred the battle of Lielauce, where the Latvian independent battalion, headed by Oskars Kalpaks managed to stop the Soviet offensive. This battle was crucial for the morale of the Latvian soldiers. The German forces on whom the Latvian temporarily relied, however, had lost a battle at Auce, so an order was received to retreat to the river Venta.

14 days later, on 29 January, the Latvian independent battalion was once again fighting a battle, this time near Skrunda. This time, however, Latvian troops were on the offensive. The Soviet forces had managed to establish a bridgehead over the river Venta, capturing the town of Skrunda on 22 January. The Venta defensive line had to be reestablished, so a counter-offensive maneuver was ordered to be overtaken. The Latvian independent battalion managed to retake the town in 3 hours. After the battle was won, the Soviet offensives ceased.

Liberation of Kurzeme and the coup d'etat
On 18 February, an agreement was signed between Latvia and Estonia, starting formation of the North Latvian Brigade led by Jorģis Zemitāns on Estonian territory.

On 3 March, the German and Latvian forces commenced a counterattack against the Red Latvian Riflemen. Tukums was recaptured from the Bolsheviks on 15 March, and Jelgava on 18 March.

On 16 April, the Baltic nobility organised a coup d'etat in Liepāja and a puppet government headed by Andrievs Niedra was established. The provisional national government took refuge aboard the steamship Saratov under British protection in Liepaja harbour.

On 22 May, Riga was recaptured by the Freikorps and organised persecution of suspected Bolshevik supporters began, with an estimated 174 (according to the head of Rīga's Gendarmerie) to 4,000–5,000 people (according to local social democrats and communists) being shot.
At the same time the Estonian Army including the North Latvian Brigade loyal to the Ulmanis government started a major offensive against the Soviets in north Latvia. By the middle of June, the Soviet rule was reduced to the area surrounding Latgale.

German–Estonian conflict 
After the capture of Riga the Baltische Landeswehr and Iron Division advanced north towards Cēsis. The objective of the Landeswehr and Iron Division had now clearly become the establishment of German supremacy in the Baltic by eliminating the Estonian military and Latvian national units, not the defeat of the Bolsheviks. The Estonian commander General Johan Laidoner insisted the Landeswehr withdraw to a line south of the Gauja River. He also ordered the Estonian 3rd Division to seize the Gulbene railroad station.

On June 19, 1919, the Landeswehr and the Iron Division launched an attack to capture Cēsis. Initially, the Freikorps captured the town of Straupe and continued their advance toward the town of Limbaži. The Estonian division launched a counterattack and drove the Landeswehr out of the town. On June 21, the Estonians received reinforcements and immediately attacked the Landeswehr, who withdrew from an area to the northeast of Cēsis. The Iron Division attacked from Straupe towards Stalbe in an effort to relieve pressure on the Landeswehr. On the morning of June 23, the Landeswehr began a general retreat toward Riga.

The Allies again insisted that the Landeswehr and Iron Division withdraw their remaining troops from Latvia, and on July 3 intervened to impose an armistice between Estonia, Latvia, and the Landeswehr and Iron Division when the Latvians were about to march into Riga.
By its terms the legitimate government of Ulmanis was to be restored, the Baltic German Landeswehr be placed under the command of the British officer Harold Alexander and the Iron Division to leave Latvia. The government of Ulmanis returned to Riga on 8 July 1919 and the Landeswehr became a component of the Latvian National Army.

Bermondt offensive

The Iron Division, however, did not leave Latvia. Instead Major Bischoff created a German Legion from over a dozen Freikorps units and turned the units over to the West Russian Volunteer Army. In total, the Iron Division transferred over 14,000 men, 64 aircraft, 56 artillery pieces, and 156 machine guns. Six cavalry units and a field hospital were also transferred. The offensive by the reformed German Army was subsequently defeated by the Latvian Army, which received assistance from British and French warships and Estonian armoured trains.

Liberation of Latgale

In January 1920 the joint forces of Latvia and Poland launched an attack on the Bolsheviks in Latgale and took Daugavpils. The Soviet Latvian government escaped to Velikiye Luki where it announced its dissolution on January 13. Units from the Estonian and Lithuanian armies also saw action alongside the Latvians, as well as Latvian partisans. The push continued until Latvian forces took hold of Zilupe on February 1 with some skirmishes continuing a few days afterwards, since a secret truce had been agreed on by the Latvians and Soviet Russia on January 30.

Peace talks began on 16 April 1920 with the Latvian–Soviet Peace Treaty being signed on 11 August 1920, officially ending the war.

Timeline

1918 
 11 November: The German Empire and Allies of World War I sign the November armistice, which marks the end of World War I; Soviet Russia launches an attack on German forces. The British Empire recognizes the de facto independence of Latvia (see Latvian Provisional National Council).
 17 November: The first legislative institution of Latvia, the People's Council (Tautas Padome) and the provisional government are established. Jānis Čakste becomes the chairman of the People's Council, while Kārlis Ulmanis becomes prime minister.
 18 November: The Republic of Latvia is proclaimed in Riga.
 28 November: The Regency Council of the United Baltic Duchy is dissolved.
 1 December: The Red Army invades Latvia.
 17 December: The government of the Latvian Socialist Soviet Republic, headed by Pēteris Stučka, is formed in Russia.

1919 
 5 January: The first military unit of Latvia — the 1st Latvian Independent Battalion, under command of Oskars Kalpaks — is formed. The provisional government retreats from Jelgava to Liepāja.
 31 January: Most of Latvia is under the control of the Red Army; the Latvian government and German forces control the area around Liepāja.
 18 February: An agreement is signed between Estonia and Latvia, which provides for the formation of the North Latvian Brigade, led by Jorģis Zemitāns, on Estonian territory.
 3 March: The united German and Latvian forces commence a counterattack against the forces of Soviet Latvia.
 6 March: Oskars Kalpaks, commander of all Latvian forces subordinated to German headquarters, is killed by German friendly fire. He is replaced by Jānis Balodis.
 10 March: Saldus comes under Latvian control.
 21 March: 1st Latvian Independent Battalion is reformed into the Latvian Independent Brigade.
 16 April: The puppet Latvian Government established by the Baltic nobility organizes a coup d'etat in Liepāja, the provisional national government of Latvia takes refuge aboard the steamship Saratow under Allied protection.
 16 May: The Estonian Army starts a major offensive against the Soviets in north Latvia.
 22 May: The Baltische Landeswehr captures Riga.
 23 May: The Latvian Independent Brigade marches into Riga.
 3 June: The Baltische Landeswehr reaches Cēsis.
 6 June: The Landeswehr's North Latvian campaign begins, commanded by Major Alfred Fletcher.
 23 June: The Estonian 3rd Division commanded by Gen. Ernst Põdder, including the 2nd Latvian Cēsis regiment of the North Latvian Brigade defeats the Landeswehr in the Battle of Cēsis.
 3 July: Estonia, Latvia and the pro-German Provisional Government of Latvia sign the Ceasefire of Strazdumuiža.
 6 July: The North Latvian Brigade enters Riga.
10 July: The North Latvian Brigade and the Independent Latvian (or South Latvian) Brigade are merged to form the Latvian Armed Forces (Latvian Army) on the order of its first Commander-in-Chief, General Dāvids Sīmansons.
 5 October: The German mission secretly leaves Riga for Jelgava, where an attack is prepared by the German-established West Russian Volunteer Army on Riga.
 8 October: The West Russian Volunteer Army attacks Riga, taking the Pārdaugava district.
 20 October: Battle of Talsi.
 3 November: The Latvian Army, supported by Estonian armored trains and the British Royal Navy, launches its counterattack.
 5 November: Battle of Liepāja.
 11 November: The Latvian Army, supported by Estonian armored trains, the Royal Navy and the French Navy, defeats the West Russian Volunteer Army in Riga. The date is celebrated as Lāčplēsis Day ever since.
 21 November:  The Latvian Army liberates Jelgava from the West Russian Volunteer Army.
 22 November: The Lithuanian Army defeats the remnants of the West Russian Volunteer Army in Lithuania near Radviliškis.

1920 
 3 January: The joint forces of Latvia and Poland launch an attack on the Bolsheviks in Latgale and take Daugavpils.
 13 January: The government of the Latvian SSR announces its resignation.
 1 February: Latvia signs a cease-fire with Soviet Russia.
 17–18 April: Elections of the Constitutional Assembly of Latvia.
 1 May: First session of the Constitutional Assembly.
 15 July: Latvia signs a cease-fire with Germany.
 11 August: The Latvian-Soviet Riga Peace Treaty is signed.

In fiction

Literature
 Blizzard of Souls, by Aleksandrs Grīns

Film
 Defenders of Riga (2007), directed by Aigars Grauba
 Blizzard of Souls (2019), directed by Dzintars Dreiberg

See also
 Aftermath of World War I
 Freikorps in the Baltic
 West Russian Volunteer Army
 Estonian War of Independence
 Lithuanian Wars of Independence
 United Baltic Duchy
 Ober Ost
 British campaign in the Baltic (1918–1919)

References

Bibliography
 
 
 BischoffJosef, Die letzte Front. Geschichte der Eiserne Division im Baltikum 1919, Berlin 1935.
 Darstellungen aus den Nachkriegskämpfen deutscher Truppen und Freikorps, Bd 2: Der Feldzug im Baltikum bis zur zweiten Einnahme von Riga. Januar bis Mai 1919, Berlin 1937; Bd 3: Die Kämpfe im Baltikum nach der zweiten Einnahme von Riga. Juni bis Dezember 1919, Berlin 1938.
 Die baltische Landeswehr im Befreiungskampf gegen den Bolschevismus. Ein Gedenkbuch, herausgegeben vom baltischen Landeswehrein, Riga 1929.
 Kiewisz Leon, Sprawy łotewskie w bałtyckiej polityce Niemiec 1914–1919, Poznań 1970.
 Łossowski Piotr, Między wojną a pokojem. Niemieckie zamysły wojenne na wschodzie w obliczu traktatu wersalskiego. Marzec-kwiecień 1919, Warszawa 1976.
 Paluszyński Tomasz, Walka o niepodległość Łotwy 1914–1920, Warszawa 1999.
 Von den baltische Provinzen zu den baltischen Staaten. Beiträge zur Entstehungsgeschichte der Republiken Estland und Lettland, Bd I (1917–1918), Bd II (1919–1920), Marburg 1971, 1977.
 Claus Grimm: "Vor den Toren Europas – Geschichte der Baltischen Landeswehr" Hamburg 1963

Conflicts in 1918
Conflicts in 1919
Conflicts in 1920
Russian Civil War
Wars of independence
1918 in Latvia
1919 in Latvia
1920 in Latvia
Wars involving Estonia
Wars involving Germany
Wars involving Latvia
Wars involving Poland
Wars involving Russia
Wars involving the United Kingdom
Latvia–Russia relations
Wars involving Lithuania
Wars involving France